Joe Tippett  (born March 1, 1982) is an American actor. He is known for playing Sam Strickland in the NBC drama series Rise and John Ross in the HBO crime drama miniseries Mare of Easttown.

Early life 
Joe Tippett was born on March 1, 1982, and grew up in Damascus, Maryland. He attended Damascus High School, where he was involved in the football team. He was also involved in his school's theater department, where he performed in his first musical, Bye Bye Birdie. After graduating from high school, he went to West Virginia University on a full scholarship but later dropped out.

Career 

Tippett did an apprenticeship and worked his first professional job at the Williamstown Theatre Festival. In 2015, he made his Broadway debut as Bait Boy in Airline Highway. The same year, he played Earl Hunterson in the American Repertory Theater production of Waitress. Two years later, Tippett played the leading man in the Off-Broadway production of All the Fine Boys.

In 2018, Tippett played Coach Strickland on NBC's Rise. In 2019, Tippett filmed the TV movie Patsy & Loretta,  playing the role of Doolittle Lynn, Loretta Lynn's husband. The TV film was broadcast on the Lifetime channel on October 19, 2019. The same year, Tippett was cast as Lucius King in NBC's Prism which is inspired by Rashomon, a 1950 Japanese psychological thriller directed by Akira Kurosawa.

In the fall of 2021 Tippett reprised his role as Earl Hunterson in the Broadway return engagement of Waitress.

Personal life
In August 2015, Tippett met singer-songwriter Sara Bareilles during the out-of-town tryout for Waitress at the American Repertory Theater in Cambridge, Massachusetts, and they began a relationship in 2016. The couple made their first public appearance at the 2017 Tony Awards. On New Year's Day in 2023, Tippett and Bareilles announced their engagement.

Filmography

Film

Television

Stage

References

External links 

 Joe Tippett on IMDb

1980 births
Living people
American male film actors
American male television actors
American male stage actors
21st-century American male actors